Phyllis Newman (March 19, 1933 – September 15, 2019) was an American actress and singer. She won the 1962 Tony Award for Best Featured Actress in a Musical for her role as Martha Vail in the musical Subways Are for Sleeping on Broadway, received the Isabelle Stevenson Award in 2009 and was nominated another Tony for Broadway Bound (1987), as well as two nominations for Drama Desk Awards.

Early life and education
Newman was born in Jersey City, New Jersey, one of three daughters of a Jewish immigrant couple. Her mother, Rachel Gottlieb, from Lithuania, was professionally known as Marvelle the Fortune Teller. Her father, Sigmund Newman, from Warsaw, billed himself as Gabel the Graphologist, working with his wife in boardwalk amusements.

Newman had two sisters, Shirley (Mrs. Elliott) Porte, and Elaine (Mrs. Harry) Sandaufer. She attended Lincoln High School, where she was voted "Future Hollywood Star."

Career

Broadway
Newman made her Broadway debut in Wish You Were Here in 1952. Additional theater credits include Bells Are Ringing, Pleasures and Palaces, The Apple Tree, On the Town, The Prisoner of Second Avenue, Awake and Sing!, Broadway Bound, and Subways Are for Sleeping, for which she won the Tony Award for Best Featured Actress in a Musical, beating out Barbra Streisand in I Can Get It for You Wholesale.

Newman played Stella Deems in the 1985 staged concert version of Follies at Avery Fischer Hall in New York. The concert produced both a cast recording as well as a filmed documentary, preserving her performance singing "Who's That Woman?".

In June 1979, Newman and Arthur Laurents collaborated on the one-woman show The Madwoman of Central Park West. Produced by Fritz Holt, it featured songs by Leonard Bernstein, Jerry Bock, John Kander, Martin Charnin, Betty Comden, Adolph Green, Edward Kleban, Fred Ebb, Sheldon Harnick, Peter Allen, Barry Manilow, Carole Bayer Sager, and Stephen Sondheim. The show ran for 86 performances at the 22 Steps Theatre in New York City.

Television
An early television role for Newman was in a 1959 episode of Beverly Garland's crime drama Decoy. The following year, she was cast as Doris Hudson on the CBS summer replacement series Diagnosis: Unknown, with Patrick O'Neal as Dr. Daniel Coffee.

Newman became a major television celebrity of the 1960s and 1970s, a frequent panelist on the top-rated network game shows What's My Line?, Match Game and To Tell the Truth and a perennial guest of Johnny Carson on NBC's The Tonight Show. She also guest-starred as Elaine, the mother of Melissa (played by Melanie Mayron), on the 1980s television series Thirtysomething.

Newman created the role of Renée Buchanan on the soap opera One Life to Live and was a regular on the primetime series 100 Centre Street and the  satirical series That Was The Week That Was. Other television credits include The Man from U.N.C.L.E.; Burke's Law; ABC Stage 67; Murder, She Wrote; and The Wild Wild West. Newman starred in Coming of Age, a short-lived comedy about a couple living in an Arizona retirement community, with veteran actors Paul Dooley, Glynis Johns and Alan Young.

Film
On screen, Newman appeared in Picnic (1955), Let's Rock (1958), Bye Bye Braverman (1968), To Find a Man (1972), Mannequin (1987), Only You (1994), The Beautician and the Beast (1997), A Price Above Rubies (1998) and The Human Stain (2003).

Music
In addition to her appearances on original cast recordings, Newman recorded Those Were the Days, an album of contemporary songs, for Sire Records in 1968. In England, the album was released as Phyllis Newman's World of Music on London Records.

The Phyllis Newman Women's Health Initiative
In 1995, Newman founded The Phyllis Newman Women's Health Initiative of the Actors Fund of America. Since then, she hosted the annual gala Nothing Like a Dame, which has raised more than US $3.5 million and served 2,500 women in the entertainment industry.

In 2009, Newman received the first Isabelle Stevenson Award, a special Tony Award, for her work with the Health Initiative. This award recognizes "an individual from the theatre community for [his or her] humanitarian work."

Memoir
Her memoir Just in Time — Notes from My Life relates her career, life with her husband, lyricist and playwright Adolph Green, and her experience with cancer.

Personal life and death
Newman was married to lyricist and playwright Adolph Green from 1960 until his death in 2002. She was the mother of journalist Adam Green and singer-songwriter Amanda Green. Newman died on September 15, 2019 at the age of 86 from complications of a lung disorder.

Filmography

See also
 List of American television actresses
 List of breast cancer patients by occupation
 List of people from Jersey City, New Jersey
 List of people from New York City

References

External links

 
 
 
 TonyAwards.com Interview with Phyllis Newman

1933 births
2019 deaths
20th-century American biographers
American women biographers
20th-century American actresses
20th-century American singers
20th-century American women writers
21st-century American biographers
21st-century American actresses
21st-century American singers
21st-century American women writers
Actresses from New York City
Actresses from Jersey City, New Jersey
American film actresses
American founders
American memoirists
American musical theatre actresses
American soap opera actresses
Lincoln High School (New Jersey) alumni
Musicians from Jersey City, New Jersey
Writers from Jersey City, New Jersey
Singers from New Jersey
Singers from New York City
Tony Award winners
American women memoirists
Sire Records artists
London Records artists
20th-century American women singers
21st-century American women singers
Jewish American actresses
Jewish American musicians
21st-century American Jews